Vitali Borisovich Polevikov (born 4 March 1989) is a former Russian professional footballer who played as a midfielder.

Club career
He made his Russian Football National League debut for FC Vityaz Podolsk on 28 March 2009 in a game against FC Nosta Novotroitsk.

References

External links
 Vitaliy Borisovich Polevikov at Sportbox.ru 

1989 births
Living people
Russian footballers
Association football midfielders
FC Vityaz Podolsk players
FC Zenit-2 Saint Petersburg players